Nabil Talhouni is a Jordanian diplomat who has served as an Ambassador to a number of countries around the world.

Biography
Nabil Talhouni was born in Jordan, and educated at the University of Bonn.

Talhouni worked for the Foreign Affairs of Jordan before becoming Jordan's Ambassador to Kuwait (1987–1990). He has also served as Ambassador to Austria (1991–1993), Ambassador to UAE (1996–1999), Ambassador to India (2001–2006), Ambassador to Thailand (2001–2006). He has also served in Dubai, London, Ottawa, Bern and Frankfurt.

References

External links
 Mohammed receives foreign officials
 Jordan's embassy in Kuwait expected to reopen next week
 Organization for Security and Co-operation in Europe
 International Atomic Energy Agency General Conference
 Technical Assistance to the Investment
 Land Mine Monitor 2001
 Prime Ministry of Jordan
 King Abdullah II visit to Thailand
 قرارات مجلس الوزراء ليوم الثلاثاء الموافق 10/9/2002م
 United Nations Framework Convention on Climate Change
 Ministry of Foreign Affairs Jordan
 Prime Ministry of Jordan
 Embssy of the Hashemite Kingdom of Jordan in India
 New Jordan Envoy (Tribune, Editorial, The Tribune, Dec 09, 2001)
 Ministry of Foreign Affairs of the Kingdom of Thailand
Ministry of External Affairs Government of India annual report 2005-2006

Ambassadors of Jordan to Kuwait
Ambassadors of Jordan to Austria
Ambassadors of Jordan to India
Ambassadors of Jordan to the United Arab Emirates
Ambassadors of Jordan to Thailand
Living people
Year of birth missing (living people)